Parliamentary elections were held in Bulgaria on 17 August 1919. The result was a victory for the Bulgarian Agrarian National Union, which won 77 of the 236 seats. Voter turnout was 55%.

Results

References

Bulgaria
1919 in Bulgaria
Parliamentary elections in Bulgaria
August 1919 events
1919 elections in Bulgaria